Annemari Birgitta Kiekara (formerly Sandell-Hyvärinen;  Sandell; born 2 January 1977 in Kalanti) is a Finnish long-distance runner. Her best achievement in track running is ninth place at the 1995 World Championships in the 10,000 metres.

Nicknamed "Annukka", she competed in 1996 Olympics, finishing 12th in 10000 meters. She is best known as a cross-country runner, in which she won the European Championship in 1995 and finished third on short course at the 1999 World Championships.

References

 
 Tilastopaja profile for Annemari Sandell-Hyvärinen (in Finnish)

1977 births
Living people
People from Uusikaupunki
Finnish female long-distance runners
Olympic athletes of Finland
Athletes (track and field) at the 1996 Summer Olympics
World Athletics Championships athletes for Finland
European Cross Country Championships winners
Sportspeople from Southwest Finland
21st-century Finnish women
20th-century Finnish women